Radiation Measurements is a monthly peer-reviewed scientific journal covering research on nuclear science and radiation physics. It was established in 1994 and is published by Elsevier.

The current editors-in-chief are Eduardo Yukihara (Paul Scherrer Institute Radiation Protection and Security) and Adrie J.J. Bos (Delft University of Technology).

Abstracting and indexing
The journal is abstracted and indexed in:
 Chemical Abstracts Service
 Index Medicus/MEDLINE/PubMed
 Science Citation Index Expanded
 Current Contents/Physical, Chemical & Earth Sciences
 Scopus

According to the Journal Citation Reports, the journal has a 2020 impact factor of 1.898.

Former titles history
Radiation Measurements is derived from the following former titles: 

Nuclear Track Detection (1977-1978)
Nuclear Tracks (1979-1981)
Nuclear Tracks and Radiation Measurements (1982-1985)
International Journal of Radiation Applications and Instrumentation. Part D. Nuclear Tracks and Radiation Measurements (1986-1992)
Nuclear Tracks and Radiation Measurements (1993)
Radiation Measurements (1994-present)

Notes

References

External links 

Physics journals
Elsevier academic journals
English-language journals
Monthly journals
Publications established in 1994